In medicine, Not Otherwise Specified (NOS) is a subcategory in systems of disease/disorder classification such as ICD-9, ICD-10, or DSM-IV. It is generally used to note the presence of an illness where the symptoms presented were sufficient to make a general diagnosis, but where a specific diagnosis was not made. The DSM-IV, for example, "applies the term not otherwise specified (NOS) to a disorder or disturbance that does not meet the criteria for the specific disorders already discussed". The term was introduced because "it is sometimes impossible for the practitioner completing the diagnostic assessment to categorize all the symptoms that a client is experiencing into one diagnostic category". In the context of mental health diagnoses, four situations have been outlined for which such a diagnosis may be considered appropriate:

It is noted, however, that the use of an NOS classification invites scrutiny when billing or seeking reimbursement for practitioners.

Examples 
This classification is commonly used in psychiatric diagnoses, such as in:
 DD-NOS, depressive disorder
 ED-NOS, eating disorder
 MD-NOS, mood disorder
 PD-NOS, personality disorder
 PDD-NOS, pervasive developmental disorder
 Psychotic disorder not otherwise specified

It is also used in the conditions:
 PTCL-NOS, peripheral T-cell lymphoma not otherwise specified
 Adenocarcinoma not otherwise specified

The ICD-10 also uses this phrase for various things, such as:
 Fall from, out of or through building, not otherwise specified (W13.9)

The phrase is also used within the List of UN numbers, where it refers to a generic entry, e.g. "UN 1993: Flammable liquid, N.O.S.".

References

International Classification of Diseases
Medical terminology